West Virginia, which seceded from Virginia to join the Union, provided the following units to the Union Army during the American Civil War. Units raised in the western counties prior to the creation of the state of West Virginia were often known as, "loyal Virginians," who formed the Restored government of Virginia in Wheeling, West Virginia in 1861, unanimously electing Francis H. Pierpont as the new state governor. The state produced the most highly-decorated cavalry regiment of the Union Army (tied with the 47th Ohio as the most highly-decorated single regiment), and was credited with 32,000 Union soldiers, including 10 Brigadier and Major Generals. The soldier count by the George Tyler Moore Center for the Study of the Civil War estimates West Virginia's to be around 20,000, and others at around 25,000, with an unknown number serving in the regiments of surrounding states. The remaining soldiers consisted of Pennsylvania and Ohio volunteers, and with re-enlistments credited as new soldiers.

Most regiments were recruited from the Northern, central and southwestern counties. Elements of two state cavalry regiments, one infantry regiment and an artillery company, almost 760 men, played a key role against Pickett's Charge in the Battle of Gettysburg, less than two weeks after the official admission of the territory into the Union as the 35th state. The 1st, 2nd and 3rd West Virginia Cavalry also played a large role in directly cutting off the Confederate retreat at Appomattox Station on April 8, 1865, and was present during General Robert E. Lee's surrender at Appomattox Court House to General Ulysses S. Grant the following day.

Infantry units
1st West Virginia Volunteer Infantry Regiment (3 Month)
1st West Virginia Volunteer Infantry Regiment (3 Year)
1st West Virginia Veteran Volunteer Infantry Regiment
2nd West Virginia Volunteer Infantry Regiment
2nd West Virginia Veteran Volunteer Infantry Regiment
3rd West Virginia Volunteer Infantry Regiment
4th West Virginia Volunteer Infantry Regiment
5th West Virginia Volunteer Infantry Regiment
6th West Virginia Volunteer Infantry Regiment
7th West Virginia Volunteer Infantry Regiment
8th West Virginia Volunteer Infantry Regiment
9th West Virginia Volunteer Infantry Regiment
10th West Virginia Volunteer Infantry Regiment
11th West Virginia Volunteer Infantry Regiment
12th West Virginia Volunteer Infantry Regiment
13th West Virginia Volunteer Infantry Regiment
14th West Virginia Volunteer Infantry Regiment
15th West Virginia Volunteer Infantry Regiment
16th West Virginia Volunteer Infantry Regiment
17th West Virginia Volunteer Infantry Regiment
Independent Battalion West Virginia Infantry
1st Independent Company Loyal Virginians

Cavalry units
1st West Virginia Volunteer Cavalry Regiment
2nd West Virginia Volunteer Cavalry Regiment
3rd West Virginia Volunteer Cavalry Regiment
4th West Virginia Volunteer Cavalry Regiment
5th West Virginia Volunteer Cavalry Regiment
6th West Virginia Volunteer Cavalry Regiment
7th West Virginia Volunteer Cavalry Regiment
Blazer's Scouts

Artillery units
Battery "A" West Virginia Light Artillery
Battery "B" West Virginia Light Artillery
Battery "C" West Virginia Light Artillery
Battery "D" West Virginia Light Artillery
Battery "E" West Virginia Light Artillery
Battery "F" West Virginia Light Artillery
Battery "G" West Virginia Light Artillery
Battery "H" West Virginia Light Artillery

See also
West Virginia in the Civil War
List of West Virginia Civil War Confederate units
Lists of American Civil War Regiments by State
Southern Unionists

Notes

References
The Civil War Archive

 
West Virginia
Civil War Union units